Julia Kaye (born June 15, 1988) is an American artist, illustrator, and voice actress. Kaye currently works as a storyboard artist and revisionist at Disney Television Animation, and is the creator of the webcomic Up and Out. She has also done work for Maxim, Cosmopolitan, BuzzFeed, GoComics, College Humor, along with other graphic design work. She provided the voice of Snapdragon in the animated series High Guardian Spice.

Personal life 

Kaye is transgender and was raised in San Jose, California, and is currently based in Los Angeles. She is Jewish.

Recognition 
Julia Kaye was nominated for Outstanding Collection by IGNATZ in 2018 for Up and Out.

Works

Up and Out 
Up and Out was started in May 2013, but it wasn't until October 2016 that her comic series began to focus on experiences specific to her transition. She originally intended for her autobiographical comics to remain unreleased, but she saw her online following for gag comic strips as a chance to raise awareness about the experience of transgender individuals. Her comics also aim to provide content for transgender individuals and others questioning their gender identity to connect with. The comics share her major milestones as a trans woman, while also documenting her moments of insecurity and self-doubt. The three-panel comics cover a variety of topics, such as the experience of being misgendered and undergoing hormone replacement therapy, while utilizing a range of tones from comedic to serious.

Kaye's comic is updated every Thursday on her website and various social media accounts that include Tumblr, Instagram, and Twitter. She originally started posting the comic on her Twitter in July 2016. The comic was first posted on Instagram in October 2016.

Super Late Bloomer: My Early Days in Transition 

Kaye's first collection of comics was released on May 1, 2018. The comics tell her story through her first year on hormone replacement therapy and her social, physical, and mental changes during that time.

Publishers Weekly called it "blunt yet precise; straightforward but nuanced; simple but beautiful. ... Kaye skillfully and effectively relates the daily indignities borne by trans women and the triumphs and quiet joys as well. Her tenacity in this hopeful story will be resonant for readers going through personal transitions of many kinds."

My Life in Transition: A Super Late Bloomer Collection 
Kaye's second collection of comics was released on February 1, 2021. They follow Julia's life now three years into her transition journey.

Television Credits

References

External links 
 
 

1988 births
Living people
21st-century American Jews
21st-century LGBT people
American illustrators
American storyboard artists
American webcomic creators
American women artists
American women illustrators
Jewish American artists
Jewish American writers
LGBT comics creators
LGBT Jews
Transgender artists
Transgender Jews
Transgender women
Artists from Los Angeles
Artists from San Jose, California
American LGBT artists
Walt Disney Animation Studios people
Place of birth missing (living people)
American women memoirists